Zhang Jian (born 30 July 1985) is a Chinese sport shooter. He was born in Anda, Heilongjiang. He competed in 25 metre rapid fire pistol at the 2012 Summer Olympics in London, where he placed fifth.

References

External links

1985 births
Living people
People from Suihua
Chinese male sport shooters
Olympic shooters of China
Shooters at the 2012 Summer Olympics
Sport shooters from Heilongjiang
Asian Games medalists in shooting
Shooters at the 2010 Asian Games
Shooters at the 2014 Asian Games
Asian Games gold medalists for China
Asian Games silver medalists for China
Asian Games bronze medalists for China
Medalists at the 2010 Asian Games
Medalists at the 2014 Asian Games
ISSF pistol shooters
21st-century Chinese people